Coelopacidia is a genus of tephritid (or fruit flies) in the family Tephritidae.

References

Trypetinae
Tephritidae genera